= King of Reggaeton =

King of Reggaeton may refer to:

- Don Omar, Puerto Rican musical artist
- Daddy Yankee, Puerto Rican musical artist

It also refers to:

- Rauw Alejandro, Puerto Rican musical artist known as the King of Modern Reggaeton
- Ozuna, Puerto Rican musical artist known as the New King of Reggaeton
